Clinotanypodini is a tribe of midges in the non-biting midge family (Chironomidae).  It was traditionally known as Coelotanypodini Fittkau, 1962, but sources such as Fauna Europaea now recognize Clinotanypi Lipina, 1928 as having priority.

Tribes & genera
Genus Coelotanypus Kieffer, 1913
Genus Clinotanypus Kieffer, 1913
C. nervosus (Meigen, 1818)

References

Tanypodinae
Nematocera tribes